Rødven is a village in Rauma Municipality in Møre og Romsdal county, Norway. The village is located along the Rødvenfjorden, just south of where the fjord empties into Romsdal Fjord. The village is notable for the 12th century Rødven Stave Church. The church is now a museum and the much newer Rødven Church sits across the road from the historic stave church.

References

Villages in Møre og Romsdal
Rauma, Norway